Every Day is a 2018 American romantic fantasy drama film directed by Michael Sucsy and written by Jesse Andrews, based on the 2012 novel of the same name by David Levithan. The film stars Angourie Rice as 16-year-old Rhiannon, who falls in love with a traveling soul who wakes each morning in a different body; Justice Smith, Debby Ryan and Maria Bello also star. The film was released on February 23, 2018.

Plot
"A" is a traveling spirit who experiences every day in the body of a different teenager.

A wakes up in the body of Justin, the neglectful boyfriend of Rhiannon. At school, Rhiannon approaches A as Justin, convincing A to skip school with her. As the day goes on, A falls in love with Rhiannon, as she confides her troubled home life following her father's mental breakdown, almost resulting in her family losing their home. At the end of their day together, A alludes to the fact that tomorrow will be different but Rhiannon responds that tomorrow is tomorrow and that today should end on "a nice note". Rhiannon feels a rekindled love for Justin, seemingly a more caring and different person.

The next day, Rhiannon finds Justin has reverted to his old, careless self and does not remember the previous day. Meanwhile, A wakes up in the body of Amy and masquerades as an exchange student to be close to Rhiannon.

Waking up as Nathan, A attends a party and finds Rhiannon. Dancing together, A and Rhiannon bond, and A tells Rhiannon she deserves better than Justin before Justin chases A off. A few days later, A texts Rhiannon to meet, and she does, assuming she is meeting Nathan.  arrives as Megan, explaining that A was Justin, Amy, and Nathan, and has fallen in love with her. Initially disdainful, Rhiannon agrees to meet with A the next day. Now in the body of James, A reveals that A has shifted bodies every day since infancy and shows her the private Instagram account with pictures taken in every body, through which Rhiannon can communicate with A. Meeting with Nathan, who believes he was possessed by the devil, Rhiannon realizes A is real. A, in the body of transgender teen Vic, convinces Rhiannon to give A a chance, suggesting that it is the soul that matters, not the body. After some thought, Rhiannon agrees to continue meeting A.

Surprised to awaken in the body of Rhiannon herself, A sees it as an opportunity to get to know Rhiannon better. A promises to be respectful of Rhiannon's privacy and her life, not breaking up with Justin or looking at Rhiannon's naked body. Over the course of the day, A bonds with Rhiannon's mother, as well as her sister and father.

The following day, having finally found the courage, Rhiannon breaks up with Justin. She immediately calls A for a weekend trip at her uncle's cabin. A, in the body of Xavier, talks about the day spent in Rhiannon's body. Rhiannon tells A that leaving a mark could be a good thing so people will know A exists, but A feels obligated to leave people's memories unchanged. At the end of the day, A kisses Rhiannon goodbye and plans to return the next day but does not, forcing Rhiannon to call her mother to pick her up. A later explains that day's body was undergoing a lung transplant. Rhiannon and A gradually become intimate and promise they will figure out how to maintain their relationship.

A wakes in the body of the suicidal Kelsea, and Rhiannon convinces A to attempt to hold onto Kelsea's body for more than twenty-four hours, to keep her alive until Kelsea's father can be alerted to her struggles. A is successful, and Rhiannon convinces A to stay in the body of her classmate, Alexander, so they can remain together. Though this seems to work for a short time, A is unwilling to take over somebody else's life permanently. Alone with Rhiannon at Alexander's house, A tells her that they cannot realistically be together forever, that Alexander himself is perfect for Rhiannon, and that A would be keeping her from that someone. Realizing that this is their last night together, Rhiannon and A dance and talk; as they wait for midnight, A tells her that "this is the nice note"alluding to Rhiannon's comment to Justin about ending their day together on "a nice note".

The next day, A awakens in another body and drives to New York while Rhiannon meets Alexander at school.

Cast

 Angourie Rice as Rhiannon
 Maria Bello as Lindsey, Rhiannon's mother
 Michael Cram as Nick, Rhiannon's father
 Debby Ryan as Jolene, Rhiannon's sister
 Amanda Arcuri as Rebecca, Rhiannon's best friend
 Charles Vandervaart as Steve
 Rohan Mead as Kev

* All following actors portray characters who are at one point inhabited by the entity "A"

 Justice Smith as Justin
 Jeni Ross as Amy
 Lucas Jade Zumann as Nathan
 Rory McDonald as David
 Katie Douglas as Megan
 Jacob Batalon as James
 Ian Alexander as Vic
 Sean Jones as George
 Colin Ford as Xavier
 Jake Sim as Michael
 Nicole Law as Kelsea
 Karena Evans as Hannah
 Owen Teague as Alexander
 Hannah Richardson as Katie

Production 
In June 2017, it was announced that MGM had acquired film rights for the novel Every Day, with Angourie Rice attached to star as Rhiannon, from a screenplay by  Jesse Andrews, author of Me and Earl and the Dying Girl, and Michael Sucsy directing.

In July 2017, the rest of the main cast was announced, as the film began production in Toronto, Ontario, Canada. Later, Owen Teague joined the cast. The film was shot in Toronto from July 6, 2017 until August 12, 2017.

Release
Orion Pictures distributed in wide release for MGM. The film was initially scheduled for release on February 2, 2018, but was pushed back to April 27, 2018, and then moved up to the final date of February 23, 2018. The studio spent around $10million for promotion.

In the United Kingdom, the British Board of Film Classification issued the film a 12A certificate but removed four seconds in order to achieve the classification. The trimmed material involved images of suicide methods.

Reception

Box office
Every Day grossed $6.1million in the United States and Canada, and $4.3million in other territories, for a worldwide gross of $10.4million.

Every Day was released alongside Game Night and Annihilation, and was projected to gross $2–4million from 1,667 theaters in its opening weekend. It earned $3.1million over the weekend, finishing ninth at the box office.

Critical response
The website's critical consensus reads, "Every Day wastes its metaphysical premise on shallow storytelling, though its diverse young cast adds flavor to an otherwise bland teen-romance." On Metacritic, the film has a weighted average score of 52 out of 100, based on 11 critics, indicating "mixed or average reviews". Audiences polled by CinemaScore gave the film an average grade of "B+" on an A+ to F scale, while PostTrak reported filmgoers gave the film a 64 percent overall positive score and a 39 percent "definite recommend".

Film critic Peter Bradshaw called the film "the quirky film overlooked by the complacent MSM gatekeeper-establishment which might be a future cult classic".

References

External links
 
 

2018 romantic drama films
2010s teen drama films
2010s teen romance films
2018 films
American LGBT-related films
American romantic drama films
American teen drama films
American teen romance films
Films based on American novels
Films based on young adult literature
Films directed by Michael Sucsy
Films set in Baltimore
Films set in Manhattan
Films shot in Toronto
Metro-Goldwyn-Mayer films
Orion Pictures films
Transgender-related films
Vertigo Films films
2018 LGBT-related films
LGBT-related romantic drama films
2010s English-language films
2010s American films